Szczurkowo  is a village in the administrative district of Gmina Sępopol, within Bartoszyce County, Warmian-Masurian Voivodeship, in northern Poland, at the border of Kaliningrad Oblast of Russia.

The initial village is partitioned, the northern area is part of the Kaliningrad Oblast and uninhabited.

Notable residents
Otto von Bolschwing (1909–1982)

Population 
1931:1,004
1939:1,139

References

External links 
color photos of the Church (1943, today destroyed)

Szczurkowo